The Battle of the Java Sea was a decisive naval battle of the Pacific campaign of World War II.

Allied navies suffered a disastrous defeat at the hand of the Imperial Japanese Navy, on 27 February 1942, and in secondary actions over successive days. The American-British-Dutch-Australian Command (ABDACOM) Strike Force commander— Dutch Rear-Admiral Karel Doorman—was killed. The aftermath of the battle included several smaller actions around Java, including the smaller but also significant Battle of Sunda Strait. These defeats led to Japanese occupation of the entire Dutch East Indies.

Background
The Japanese invasion of the Dutch East Indies progressed at a rapid pace as they advanced from their Palau Islands colony and captured bases in Sarawak and the southern Philippines. They seized bases in eastern Borneo and in northern Celebes while troop convoys, screened by destroyers and cruisers with air support provided by swarms of fighters operating from captured bases, steamed southward through the Makassar Strait and into the Molucca Sea. To oppose these invading forces was a small force, consisting of Dutch, American, British and Australian warships—many of them of World War I vintage—initially under the command of American Admiral Thomas C. Hart.

On 23 January 1942, a force of four American destroyers attacked a Japanese invasion convoy in Makassar Strait as it approached Balikpapan in Borneo. On 13 February, the Allies fought unsuccessfully—in the Battle of Palembang—to prevent the Japanese from capturing the major oil port in eastern Sumatra. On the night of 19/20 February, an Allied force attacked the Eastern Invasion Force off Bali in the Battle of Badung Strait. Also on 19 February, the Japanese made two air raids on Darwin, on the Australian mainland, one from carrier-based planes and the other by land-based planes. The destruction of Darwin rendered it useless as a supply and naval base to support operations in the East Indies.

Battle

The Japanese amphibious forces gathered to strike at Java, and on 27 February 1942, the main Allied naval force, under Doorman, sailed northeast from Surabaya to intercept a convoy of the Eastern Invasion Force approaching from the Makassar Strait. The Eastern Strike Force, as it was known, consisted of two heavy cruisers ( and ), three light cruisers (Doorman's flagship ,), and nine destroyers (and ).

The Japanese task force protecting the convoy, commanded by Rear-Admiral Takeo Takagi, consisted of two heavy ( and ) and two light cruisers ( and ) and 14 destroyers (and ) including the 4th Destroyer Squadron under the command of Rear Admiral Shoji Nishimura. The Japanese heavy cruisers were much more powerful, armed with ten 8-inch (203 mm) guns each, and superb torpedoes. By comparison, Exeter was armed only with six 8-inch guns and only six of Houstons nine 8-inch guns remained operable after her aft turret had been knocked out in an earlier air attack.

The Allied force engaged the Japanese in the Java Sea, and the battle raged intermittently from mid-afternoon to midnight as the Allies tried to reach and attack the troop transports of the Java invasion fleet, but they were repulsed by superior firepower. The Allies had local air superiority during the daylight hours, because Japanese air power could not reach the fleet in the bad weather. The weather also hindered communications, making cooperation between the many Allied parties involved—in reconnaissance, air cover and fleet headquarters—even worse than it already was. The Japanese also jammed the radio frequencies. Exeter was the only ship in the battle equipped with radar, an emerging technology at the time.

The battle consisted of a series of attempts over a seven-hour period by Doorman's Combined Striking Force to reach and attack the invasion convoy; each was rebuffed by the escort force with heavy losses being inflicted on the Allies.

The fleets sighted each other at about 16:00 on 27 February and closed to firing range, opening fire at 16:16. Both sides exhibited poor gunnery and torpedo skills during this phase of the battle. Despite her recent refit (with the addition of modern Type 284 gunnery control radar), Exeters shells did not come close to the Japanese ships, while Houston only managed to achieve a straddle on one of the opposing cruisers.  The only notable result of the initial gunnery exchange was Exeter being critically damaged by a hit in the boiler room from an 8-inch shell. The ship then limped away to Surabaya, escorted by Witte de With.

The Japanese launched two huge torpedo salvoes, consisting of 92 torpedoes in all, but scored only one hit, on Kortenaer. She was struck by a Long Lance, broke in two and sank rapidly after the hit.

Electra—covering Exeter—engaged in a duel with Jintsū and Asagumo, scoring several hits but suffering severe damage to her superstructure. After a serious fire started on Electra and her remaining turret ran out of ammunition, abandon ship was ordered. On the Japanese side, only Asagumo was forced to retire because of damage.

The Allied fleet broke off and turned away around 18:00, covered by a smoke screen laid by the four destroyers of U.S. Destroyer Division 58 (DesDiv 58). They also launched a torpedo attack but at too long a range to be effective. Doorman's force turned south toward the Java coast, then west and north as night fell in an attempt to evade the Japanese escort group and fall on the convoy. It was at this point the ships of DesDiv 58—their torpedoes expended—left on their own initiative to return to Surabaya.

Shortly after, at 21:25, Jupiter ran onto a mine – believed to have been discarded by a Dutch minelayer – in shallow water and was sunk, while about 20 minutes later, the fleet passed where Kortenaer had sunk earlier, and Encounter was detached to pick up survivors.

Doorman's command, now reduced to four cruisers, again encountered the Japanese escort group at 23:00; both columns exchanged fire in the darkness at long range, until the Java and De Ruyter were torpedoed in the same devastating salvo; Java exploded and sank within minutes, while De Ruyter was struck and disabled while evading and went under several hours later. Only 111 were saved from both ships, Doorman among the dead, having gone down with the De Ruyter.

Only the cruisers Perth and Houston remained; low on fuel and ammunition, and following Doorman's last order to ignore survivors and proceed to Batavia, the two ships retired, arriving at Tanjung Priok on 28 February.

Although the Allied fleet did not reach the invasion fleet, the battle did give the defenders of Java a one-day respite.

Aftermath

Battle of Sunda Strait

Perth and Houston were at Tanjung Priok on 28 February when they received orders to sail through Sunda Strait to Tjilatjap. Material was running short in Java, and neither was able to rearm or fully refuel. Departing at 19:00 on 28 February for the Sunda Strait, by chance they encountered the main Japanese invasion fleet for West Java in Bantam Bay. The Allied ships were engaged by at least three cruisers and several destroyers.

In a ferocious night action that ended after midnight on 1 March, Perth and Houston were sunk. A Japanese minesweeper and a troop transport were sunk by friendly fire, while three other transports were damaged and had to be beached.

The Dutch destroyer HNLMS Evertsen had been scheduled to depart Tanjung Priok with the cruisers, but was delayed, and she followed them about two hours later.  Her crew sighted the gunfire of the main action, and her captain managed to evade the Japanese main force.  However, Evertsen was then engaged by two Japanese destroyers in the Strait, and on fire and in a sinking condition, grounded herself on a reef near Sebuku Island.  The surviving crew abandoned ship just as the aft magazine exploded.

Second Java Sea

However, all three ships were intercepted by the Japanese heavy cruisers Nachi, Haguro, Myōkō and Ashigara—and their attendant destroyers—on the morning of 1 March. Exeter and Encounter were sunk together around noon, while Pope escaped only to be sunk several hours later by aerial attack.

Bali Strait

The four U.S. destroyers of DesDiv 58—John D. Edwards, John D. Ford, Alden, and Paul Jones—were also at Surabaya; they left for Australia via the harbor's shallow eastern entrance at nightfall on 28 February. After a brief encounter with Japanese destroyers in the Bali Strait, which they were able to evade, they reached Fremantle safely on 4 March.

Consequences
Another Dutch destroyer (HNLMS Witte de With) and three American ships (destroyers USS Pillsbury and USS Edsall, along with the gunboat USS Asheville) were either scuttled or sunk as they attempted to escape to Australia. The main ABDA naval force had been almost totally destroyed: 10 ships and approximately 2,173 sailors had been lost. The Battle of the Java Sea ended significant Allied naval operations in Southeast Asia in 1942, and Japanese land forces invaded Java on 28 February. The Dutch surface fleet was practically eradicated from Asian waters and the Netherlands would never reclaim full control of its colony.  The Japanese now controlled one of the most important food-producing regions (Java), and by conquering the Dutch East Indies, Japan also controlled the fourth-largest oil producing area in the world in 1940.

The U.S. and Royal Air Force retreated to Australia. Dutch troops, aided by British remnants, fought fiercely for a week. In the campaign the Japanese executed many Allied POWs and sympathizing Indonesians. Eventually, the Japanese won this decisive battle of attrition and ABDA forces surrendered on 9 March.

Wrecks 
As of 2002 the location of the wreck of only one of the eight ships sunk during the two so-called Java Sea Battles, HMS Jupiter, was known and plotted on an Admiralty chart. However, given her location in very shallow water so close to shore she had already been heavily salvaged.

In December 2002 the wrecks of HNLMS Java and HNLMS De Ruyter were discovered by a specialist wreck diving group aboard the dive vessel MV Empress. Empress then went on to discover the wrecks of HMS Electra in August 2003; HNLMS Kortenaer in August 2004; and HMS Exeter and HMS Encounter in February 2007.  When discovered these wrecks were all in a very well-preserved state, save for battle damage. In late 2008, Empress discovered remnants of the last wreck, USS Pope, which had already been largely removed by illegal salvage diving operations.

Although the MV Empress team kept the locations of their discoveries secret, by 2017 all eight ships had been reduced to remnants or even entirely removed by illegal commercial salvage operations.'

References

Bibliography

 Firsthand account of the battle by the captain of the Japanese destroyer Amatsukaze.

 Firsthand account of the battle by a survivor from USS Houston.

Visual media
 – 135-minute documentary of the battle. Won the "Golden Calf" award for "Best Long Documentary" at the 1996 Nederlands Film Festival.

To the Java Sea: The Diary, Letters and Papers of Henry E. Eccles links

1942 in Japan
Japanese occupation of the Dutch East Indies
Java Sea
Naval battles of World War II involving Australia
Naval battles of World War II involving Japan
Naval battles of World War II involving the Netherlands
Java Sea
Naval battles of World War II involving the United States
South West Pacific theatre of World War II
February 1942 events